Francis Asbury "Frank" Wallar (August 15, 1840April 30, 1911) was a Union Army volunteer in the American Civil War and received the Medal of Honor for actions on the first day of the Battle of Gettysburg, July 1, 1863.  He was a corporal in Company I of the 6th Wisconsin Infantry Regiment, in the Iron Brigade of the Army of the Potomac.  During the battle, he engaged a Confederate soldier in single combat, capturing him and seizing his battle flag.

Following the war he became Sheriff of Vernon County, Wisconsin. Wallar died in 1911 and was buried in Walnut Mound Cemetery in Retreat, Wisconsin. A plaque commemorating Wallar was installed at the cemetery in Retreat in 1961.

Medal of Honor citation
Rank and organization: Corporal, Company I, 6th Wisconsin Infantry. Place and date: At Gettysburg, Pa., July 1, 1863. Entered service at: DeSoto, Vernon County, Wis. Birth: Guernsey County, Ohio. Date of issue: December 1, 1864. 

Citation:

Capture of flag of 2d Mississippi Infantry (C.S.A.).

See also
List of Medal of Honor recipients for the Battle of Gettysburg
List of American Civil War Medal of Honor recipients: T–Z

Notes

References

1840 births
1911 deaths
United States Army Medal of Honor recipients
United States Army soldiers
People from Guernsey County, Ohio
People from De Soto, Wisconsin
People from Vernon County, Wisconsin
People of Wisconsin in the American Civil War
Burials in Wisconsin
American Civil War recipients of the Medal of Honor
Wisconsin sheriffs